Lozenets, sometimes transliterated as Lozenetz or Lozenec, is a district and residential area located in the southern parts of Sofia, Bulgaria.  it has 49,200 inhabitants.

Features

Lozenets has many modern buildings as well as many communist-era apartment blocks and pre-1944 houses. The area is undergoing regeneration with areas experiencing intensive new construction. There are tree-lined streets, and many public parks in Sergey and the surrounding areas. The area has a direct view of Vitosha mountain. A large new church is under construction. There are many cultural and educational institutes including 13 schools and three reference libraries (Bulgarian: chitalishte). Lozenets is known as a high end very desirable residential district with number of modern luxury residential development. It is split over “Upper” and “Lower” sub districts with the “Lower Lozenets” directly bordering the center of Sofia. It mainly features smaller 3-4 story blocks, manor houses and detached houses. The “Upper Lozenets” was mainly developed during the 90s of 20th century and features lavish modern apartment buildings. This area has somewhat worse infrastructure with many locations deprived of central heating from the Municipal- owned central water heating operator. Yet the “Upper Lozenets” is known as a luxurious district, located on a hill raising high above the rest of the central areas of the city and bordering the South Park. In the “Upper Lozenets” are the American Embassy, Marinela Hotel and the Government Hospital. It is located on a  Healthcare infrastructure includes the largest hospital in Central and Eastern Europe "Tokuda" with a personnel of more than 1,100 medics and three clinics. The City Center Sofia mall, European Union Metro Station and James Bourchier Metro Station are within walking distance from the district. One of the royal residences of former king Simeon - Lozenets Residence (Резиденция Лозенец, Rezidentsiya Lozenets) is located here.

Landmarks 
 Sofia Zoo
 Acibadem City Clinic Tokuda Hospital
 Hotel Marinela Sofia
 "Krâsta" (the Cross) locality
 The Water Tower
 Sofia Land amusement park
 The Old Wall

References

External links 

Sergey on the official site of the Capital Municipality

Districts of Sofia